Holtensen may refer to the following places in Lower Saxony, Germany:

a part of Barsinghausen
a part of Einbeck
a part of Göttingen
a part of Hamelin
a part of Springe
a part of Wennigsen